Senator Rowell may refer to:

Chester Rowell (1844–1912), California State Senate
John W. Rowell (1835–1924), Vermont State Senate